Kilikolloor, also known as Kilikollur, is a neighbourhood in Kollam district in Kerala, India. It is a center of the cashew industry in the area, and is also a hub of automobile production.

National Highway 744 passes through Killikolloor. It is served by Kilikolloor railway station, a stop for trains to and from Kollam, Paravur, Punalur, Thiruvananthapuram, Kanyakumari, Ernakulam, and Guruvayur.

Thangal Kunju Musaliar College of Engineering is located in Kilikollur. A zonal office of Kollam Municipal Corporation is also located in the neighbourhood.

Merging of Kilikollur with Kollam City Corporation
Kilikollur was a panchayath and was formed in 1953. It was included in Anchalumoodu block of Kollam district with an area of 11.24 km2. Kollam has been a commercial center in India since at least 851 AD. When Kollam Municipality was upgraded to a city corporation in the year 2000, it was merged with Killikollur.

Location
 Kollam Junction railway station - 5.5 km
 Andamukkam City Bus Stand - 6 km
 Kollam KSRTC Bus Station - 6.5 km
 Kollam Port - 8 km
 Chinnakada - 5.5 km
 Thangassery - 8.2 km

See also 
 Kollam Junction railway station 3 km
 Andamukkam City Bus Stand4KM
 Kadappakada2KM
 Chinnakada3KM

References

Neighbourhoods in Kollam
Cashew processing hubs in Kollam